Rawley Springs is an unincorporated community located in Rockingham County, in the U.S. state of Virginia.

Geography 
It is located nine miles west of Harrisonburg, north of Clover Hill, along U.S. Route 33, near the George Washington National Forest. It lies on the Dry River and is situated on the southern slope of the North Mountain.

References

Unincorporated communities in Rockingham County, Virginia
Unincorporated communities in Virginia